Harding Creek may refer to:

Harding Creek (Missouri)
Harding Creek (South Dakota)